Peter Kohl FAHA FHRS FTPS is a scientist specializing in integrative cardiac research. He studies heterocellular electrophysiological interactions in cardiac tissue, myocardial structure-function relationships using 'wet' and 'dry' lab models, and mechano-electrical autoregulation of the heart.

Education 
Kohl studied medicine and biophysics in Moscow before completing his doctorate and his residency in physiology  at the Humboldt University in Berlin. Supported by a scholarship from the Boehringer-Ingelheim Foundation, he went as a post-doctoral researcher to the chair of Prof. Denis Noble, Department of Physiology at the University of Oxford, where - using a combination of experimental and theoretical models - he explored cardiac mechanobiology and heterocellular interactions.

Career 
Supported by personal fellowships from the UK Royal Society and the British Heart Foundation, he founded the Cardiac Mechano-Electric Feedback Lab at Oxford. Work from this time ranged from the mechanistic explanation of the Bainbridge effect (mechanically induced increase in heart rate) in isolated pacemaker cells stretched during patch clamp measurements with carbon fibres, the description of a stretch-induced increase in calcium release from the sarcoplasmic reticulum as a mechanism contributing to the Frank–Starling law, to the exploration of direct electrical coupling of cardiac fibroblasts and muscle cells.

After two decades of research and teaching at Oxford, Kohl was appointed Inaugural Chair in Cardiac Biophysics and Systems Biology at Imperial College London. Work during this time, funded by the ERC Advanced Grant CardioNECT, focused on the development and use of novel optogenetic and fluorometric techniques, resulting in the first functional demonstration of heterocellular electrical cell coupling in native heart tissue. After five years in London, Kohl was recruited to Freiburg University in 2016 as the founding director of the Institute for Experimental Cardiovascular Medicine (IEKM).

The English-language IEKM is structured with flat hierarchies and a broad interdisciplinary profile. About 40% of staff are from outside Germany, with scientific backgrounds in physiology, pharmacology, medicine, biology, physics, engineering and mathematics. The institute has grown from 6 to almost 60 staff and students in just a few years, and has raised more than €13M in dedicated funding, established a novel biobank concept (in which functional data collected on live human tissue are an integral part of the biobank), and committed to teaching in small group formats.

Honours 
Kohl is a visiting professor at the University of Oxford and Imperial College London. He served as co-founding director (with Peter Coveney, University College London) of the Virtual Physiological Human Network of Excellence (VPH NoE) and he is the Speaker of the German national collaborative research centre SFB1425 'Make Better Scars'. From 2018-2020, Kohl was joint Editor-in-Chief (with Denis Noble and Tom Blundell) of Progress in Biophysics and Molecular Biology. Since April 2022, he is Editor-in-Chief of The Journal of Physiology.

References 

Living people
German physiologists
Academics of the University of Oxford
Academics of Imperial College London
Academic staff of the University of Freiburg
Humboldt University of Berlin alumni
Alumni of the University of Oxford
1962 births